Mia Florentine Weiss (born  1980 in Würzburg) is a German conceptual and performance artist. Her work encompasses various artistic disciplines such as performance, text, blood, installation, sculpture, objets trouvés, photography and film.

Her work has been shown in Museums and Art fairs internationally. Her sculptural ambigram  has travelled Europe as a symbol of peace and a change of perspective.

Selected exhibitions 

Weiss created a sculpture which can be either read as Love or Hate depending on which side it is viewed from. Since 2018, she has run a pro-European campaign #LOVEUROPE with the  sculpture in different countries in and outside Europe: Germany, Austria, Belgium, France, Russia, Czech Republic.

In June 2018, her work was included in Die BUNTE Art in the Museum of Urban and Contemporary Art in Munich, Germany.

In 2018 she was part of the URBAN NATION Artist in Residence Programme in the Urban Nation Museum for Urban Contemporary Art in Berlin (Germany).

References

Further reading 
 Oelmann, Sabine: „Zwischen Liebe und Hass Mia Florentine Weiss, Madonna of Art". Published on 4 April 2017 auf n-tv Online
 Gisbourne, Mark und Broecking, Maxi: Mia Florentine Weiss. Ten Years of Work. 2006–2016, Berlin: Galerie Friedmann-Hahn, 2016
 Pirich, Carolin: „Man braucht Ackergäule, keine Flügel". Published on 5 December 2015 in taz Online
 Anonymer Autor: Sonderausstellung: Mit „Pegasus" rund um die mitnichten heile Welt. Published on 18 November 2015 in Frankfurter Neue Presse Online
 Stillbauer, Thomas: Senckenberg-Naturmuseum: Auf der Suche nach Zuflucht. Published on 13 November 2015 in Frankfurter Rundschau Online
 Scholz, Claudia: Kunstprojekt für Flüchtlinge: Die Suche nach Geborgenheit. Published on 12 November 2015 in Cicero Online
 Bok, Anna: Top 6 Highlights: Berlin Art Week. Published on 14 September 2015 in Harpers Bazaar Online
Kathe, Sandra: Senckenberg-Museum: Pegasus’ Reise beginnt am Main. Published on 20 April 2015 in Frankfurter Neue Presse Online
 Magel, Eva-Maria: Achtung, fliegendes Pferd! .Published on Frankfurter Allgemeine Zeitung Online
 Dörrenberg, Clemens: Senckenberg: Ein Pferd schwebt ins Museum..Published on 19 April 2015 in Frankfurter Rundschau Online
 Albers Ben Chamo, Sophie: Pegasus Projekt: Kunst entlang der Flüchtlingsrouten. Published on 7 September 2015 in Stern Online

External links 

 Website

Living people
20th-century German women artists
21st-century German women artists
1980 births